A buttery, also known as a rowie or Aberdeen roll or just Roll,  is a savoury bread roll originating from Aberdeen, Scotland.

Origin
Legend has it that the buttery was made for the fishermen sailing from Aberdeen harbour. The theory is that they needed a bread that would not become stale during the two weeks or more that they were at sea. The high fat content meant the bread also provided an immediate energy source.

Butteries are typically made from flour, butter, lard, salt, sugar and yeast. However, concerns have been raised about major commercial producers swapping the traditional butter and lard mixture for palm oil.

Serving

Butteries are noted for their flaky texture and buttery taste, similar to that of a croissant, and slight saltiness. They are often toasted and served with jam or butter, or plain with tea, although the high fat content makes them extremely hot when toasted.

As the alternative name of Aberdeen roll suggests, butteries are a speciality of Aberdeen but they are common throughout the Northeast of Scotland and are available worldwide.

Articles in the Aberdeen Journal from early in the 19th century bemoan the increased use of lard in place of butter in traditional "butter rolls". In 1917 when restrictions were placed on the sale of bread owing to World War I, butteries were exempt, enabling Aberdeen bakers to continue to produce rowies. The exemption was rescinded a few months later but appeals were made on the grounds that butteries were an intrinsic "part of the food of the working classes in industrial centres." Aberdeen City Food Control Committee continued to challenge the validity of the restriction two years later in February 1919.

In 2006 a buttery was offered for sale on eBay during a fund raising for the Royal Aberdeen Children's Hospital; the successful bidder, Enterprise Engineering, paid £620 for it.

Radio and TV presenter Sir Terry Wogan once memorably described eating a buttery as like having a "mouth full of seaweed".

World Buttery Championship 
The first ever World Buttery Championships took place on Saturday, 16 June 2018 at the Aberdeen campus of North East of Scotland College.

The competition was organised by Martin Gillespie on behalf of Slow Food Aberdeen City and Shire to celebrate the Traditional Buttery being 'boarded' on the Slow Food Ark of Taste.

10 finalists took part in a live bake-off and the results were judged in a blind taste test with Mark Barnett, of Gold'N'Crispy, New Pitsligo being crowned the winner.

See also

 List of bread rolls
 List of British breads

References

External Links 

 Aberdeen Buttery Recipe

Scottish breads
Yeast breads
British breads
Foods featuring butter
Aberdeen